Benjamin Dudley Dwinnell  (September 14, 1834 - December 15, 1916) was an American law enforcement officer, military officer and politician who served as the nineteenth Sheriff  of Worcester County, Massachusetts.

Early life
Dwinnell was born in Charlestown, New Hampshire on September 14, 1834. 
Dwinnell was educated in the local public schools, after his education he worked for a year in the printing operations of the National Eagle in Claremont, New Hampshire after which Dwinnell moved to Worcester, Massachusetts where he worked in the grocery trade and in a hardware store.

Family life
On December 19, 1861, Dwinnell married Nellie Shepard, Daughter of Russell Rice Shepard of Worcester, Massachusetts.

Military service
In 1862 Dwinnell enlisted in the 51st Regiment Massachusetts Volunteer Infantry.  Dwinell served as a First Lieutenant and Quartermaster of the 51st Regiment.  In February 1864, after his enlistment in the 51st Regiment expired Dwinnell enlisted as a First Lieutenant and Quartermaster of the 2nd Regiment Massachusetts Volunteer Heavy Artillery, serving with Augustus B. R. Sprague.  Dwinnell saw service with the 2nd Regiment in Virginia and North Carolina.  Having reached the rank of Brevet Major; Dwinnell was mustered out on September 23, 1865.

Post war service
After the American Civil War, Dwinnell returned to Worcester where he became the assistant Post Master under General Josiah Pickett.  In 1875 Dwinnell was appointed, by his former commanding officer Sheriff Augustus B. R. Sprague, as a Deputy Sheriff, and the Jailer and Master of the House of Correction at Fitchburg, Massachusetts.

Notes

1834 births
1916 deaths
Sheriffs of Worcester County, Massachusetts
Massachusetts Republicans
Politicians from Worcester, Massachusetts
People of Massachusetts in the American Civil War
Massachusetts city council members
Politicians from Fitchburg, Massachusetts